Salawat (plural of Salat) or aṣ-ṣalātu ʿala -n-nabī (from Arabic: الصلاة على النبي), an invocation which Muslims make by saying specific phrases to compliment prophet Muhammad

It may also refer to:
Salawat Yulayev (1754–1800), Bashkir national hero who participated in Pugachev's Rebellion
Salawat (album), album by Mesut Kurtis

See also
 Salavat Yulayev (film), a 1941 Soviet film directed by Yakov Protazanov
 Salawat Yulayev (opera), opera in three acts by the Bashkir composer Zagir Ismagilov
Salavat Yulaev Ufa, professional ice hockey team based in Ufa in the Republic of Bashkortostan, a federal subject of the Russian Federation
Salawati (disambiguation)